Cartoon Network is a Turkish television channel that mainly broadcasts cartoons. It was launched on 28 January 2008 and is owned by Demirören Holding under license from Warner Bros. Discovery International.

History
The channel launched on 28 January 2008.

On 4 April 2011, the channel rebranded with  the CHECK IT 1.0 package. Around this time, it also began to play movie sponsorships for The Smurfs and Arthur Christmas.

On 1 January 2015, the channel rebranded itself with new graphics (Check It 3.0). One year later, on 6 October 2016, the channel switched from 4:3 to 16:9 aspect ratio. On 1 January 2017, Cartoon Network started to use graphics from Cartoon Network USA's Dimensional 2016 rebrand package.

Ratings

The channel displays ratings before each program and a few seconds once it starts or comes back from commercials (in this case only the number appears). The ratings are described as follows:
 Genel İzleyici (General Audience) is used for shows suitable for a general audience. We Bare Bears (TV-Y7 in the US), Summer Camp Island (TV-Y7), New Looney Tunes (TV-Y7) and Craig of the Creek (TV-Y7) currently use this rating, as well as many movies and miscellaneous programs on the channel.
 7 Yaş ve Üzeri & Şiddet / Korku (7+ Violence/Horror) is used for shows suitable for children aged 7 and up which contain fantasy violence and/or horror. The Powerpuff Girls (TV-Y7-FV in the US), Supernoobs (TV-Y7-FV), Unikitty! (TV-Y7) and Yo-Kai Watch (TV-Y7-FV) currently use this rating.
 7 Yaş ve Üzeri & Olumsuz (7+ Negative Examples) is used for shows suitable for children aged 7 and up which contain negative examples. Shows in the Total Drama franchise (TV-PG/TV-PG-D) currently use this rating.
 7 Yaş ve Üzeri & Şiddet / Korku & Olumsuz (7+ with Violence/Horror and Negative Examples) is used for shows suitable for children aged 7 and up which contain both negative examples, fantasy violence and/or horror. The Amazing World of Gumball (TV-Y7-FV), Mighty Magiswords (TV-Y7), Adventure Time (TV-PG/TV-PG-V), Teen Titans Go! (TV-PG), Power Rangers (TV-Y7-FV) and Regular Show (TV-PG/TV-PG-V) currently use this rating (some of the shows mentioned use edited versions for some episodes).

References

External links

Cartoon Network
2008 establishments in Azerbaijan
2008 establishments in Northern Cyprus
2008 establishments in Turkey
Children's television channels in Turkey
Doğan Media Group
Television channels and stations established in 2008
Television stations in Azerbaijan
Television stations in Turkey
Turner Broadcasting System Europe
Warner Bros. Discovery EMEA